The National Book Award for Nonfiction is one of five U.S. annual National Book Awards, which are given by the National Book Foundation to recognize outstanding literary work by U.S. citizens. They are awards "by writers to writers". The panelists are five "writers who are known to be doing great work in their genre or field".

The original National Book Awards recognized the "Most Distinguished" biography and nonfiction books (two) of 1935 and 1936, and the "Favorite" nonfiction books of 1937 to 1940. The "Bookseller Discovery" and the "Most Original Book" sometimes recognized nonfiction. (See below.)

The general "Nonfiction" award was one of three when the National Book Awards were re-established in 1950 for 1949 publications, which the National Book Foundation considers the origin of its current Awards series.
From 1964 to 1983, under different administrators, there were multiple nonfiction categories.

The current Nonfiction award recognizes one book written by a U.S. citizen and published in the U.S. from December 1 to November 30. The National Book Foundation accepts nominations from publishers until June 15, requires mailing nominated books to the panelists by August 1, and announces five finalists in October. The winner is announced on the day of the final ceremony in November. The award is $10,000 and a bronze sculpture; other finalists get $1000, a medal, and a citation written by the panel.
The sculpture by Louise Nevelson dates from the 1980 awards. The $10,000 and $1000 cash prizes and autumn recognition for current-year publications date from 1984.

About 200 books were nominated for the 1984 award, when the single award for general nonfiction was restored.

Multiple nonfiction categories (1964-1983)
For the 1963/1964 cycle, three new award categories replaced "Nonfiction": Arts and Letters; History and Biography; Science, Philosophy and Religion. For the next twenty years there were at least three award categories for nonfiction books marketed to adult readers and the term "Nonfiction" was used only 1980 to 1983 ("General Nonfiction", hardcover and paperback).

Recipients

1935-1940 
The National Book Awards for 1935 to 1940 annually recognized the "most distinguished" or "favorite" book of General Nonfiction or simply Nonfiction. In 1935 and 1936 there was distinct award to the most distinguished Biography; both winners were autobiographies. Meanwhile, four of the six general nonfiction winners were autobiographical and one more was a biography. Furthermore, all books were eligible for the "Bookseller Discovery" and "Most Original Book" (two awards); nonfiction winners are listed here. In 1937 and 1939 alone, the New York Times reported close seconds and runners up respectively.

There was only one National Book Award for 1941, the Bookseller Discovery, which recognized a novel; then none until their 1950 revival for 1949 books in three categories including general Nonfiction.

1950s 
The first awards in the current series were presented to the best books of 1949 at the annual convention dinner of the booksellers, book publishers, and book manufacturers in New York City, March 16, 1950. There were honorable mentions ("special citations") in the non-fiction category only.

1960s

1960-1963

1964-1969 
From 1964-1969, winners were presented by specific categories (e.g., Arts and Letters). However, finalists were presented in one general nonfiction category. Individual categories of finalists have been guessed.

Arts and Letters

History and Biography

Science, Philosophy and Religion

1970s 
Throughout the 1970s, the National Book Award was separated into multiple categories.

Arts and Letters

History, Biography, and Autobiography 
In some years, the History and Biography awards were combined, while in others, they were two separate categories.

Philosophy and Religion

The Sciences

Contemporary Affairs

1980s

1980-1983 
From 1980 to 1983 there were dual awards for hardcover (hc) and paperback (ppb) books in all nonfiction subcategories and some others. Most of the paperback award winners were second and later editions that had been previously eligible in their first editions. Here the first edition publication year is given parenthetically except the calendar year preceding the award is represented by "(new)".

In 1980, the "Nonfiction" category included the following genres, each in both paperback and hardcover.

Autobiography and Biography

Current Interest

General nonfiction

General reference

History

Religion/Inspiration

Science

1983/1984 

The awards practically went out of business that spring. Their salvation with a reduced program to be determined was announced in November. The revamp was completed only next summer, with an autumn program recognizing books published during the award year (initially, preceding November to current October). There were no awards for books published in 1983 before November.

1984 entries for the "revamped" awards in merely three categories were published November 1983 to October 1984; that is, approximately during the award year. Eleven finalists were announced October 17. Winners were announced and celebrated November 15, 1984.

1984-1989

1990s

2000s

2010s

2020s

Repeat winners
See also Winners of multiple U.S. National Book Awards

Three books have won two literary National Book Awards (that is, excluding graphics), all in nonfiction subcategories of 1964 to 1983.

John Clive, Thomas Babington Macaulay: The Shaping of the Historian
1974 Biography; 1974 History
Peter Matthiessen, The Snow Leopard
1979 Contemporary Thought; 1980 General Nonfiction, Paperback
Lewis Thomas, The Lives of a Cell: Notes of a Biology Watcher
1975 Arts and Letters; 1975 Science

Matthiessen and Thomas won three Awards (as did Saul Bellow, all fiction). Matthiessen won the 2008 fiction award. Thomas is one of several authors of two Award-winning books in nonfiction categories.
 Justin Kaplan, 1961, 1981 (Arts and Letters, Biography/Autobiography)
 George F. Kennan, 1957, 1968 (Nonfiction, History and Biography)
 Anne Morrow Lindbergh, 1936, 1939 (Non-Fiction, Non-Fiction)
 David McCullough, 1978, 1982 (History, Autobiography/Biography)
 Arthur Schlesinger, 1966, 1979 (History and Biography, Biography and Autobiography)
 Frances Steegmuller, 1971, 1981 (Arts and Letters, Translation)
 Lewis Thomas, 1975, 1981 (Arts and Letters and Science, Science)

See also
List of winners of the National Book Award, winners only.

Notes

References

American non-fiction literary awards
National Book Award
Awards established in 1935